Kakua may be,

Kakua language
Kakua Chiefdom
Kakua Union